Siragadikka Aasai is an 2023 Indian Tamil-language drama television series, starring Gomathi Priya and Vetri Vasanth in lead roles. It premiered on Star Vijay on 23 January, 2023 on Monday to Friday at 21:30 and is also available on the digital platform Disney+ Hotstar. This series was launched along with Mahanathi.

Synopsis
Meena (Gomathi Priya), a young woman who works in a flower shop, and Muthukumar (Vetri Vasanth), an alcoholic who disdains everyone around him, are central characters in the story. They unexpectedly get married. Because of his history, Muthukumar despises love and marriage, is disinterested in life, and avoids his newlywed wife Meena. However, Muthu's devotion and adoration for his father and grandmother do not change. Will Meena meet Muthukumar and fall in love?

Cast

Main 
 Gomathi Priya as Meena
 A young woman who works in a flower shop, she is a kind and sweet girl who respect everyone. (2023-present)
 Vetri Vasanth as Muthukumar (Muthu) 
 An alcoholic guy, who doesn't listen to everyone. But Muthu’s love and affection towards his father and grandmother stays unchanged. (2023-present)

Supporting 
 R. Sundarrajan as Annamalai: Muthukumar`s father.
 Anila Sreekumar as Vijaya: Muthukumar`s Mother.
 Narasimha Raju as Jayaraj: Meena`s Father (Jan 2023 - Feb 2023 ) 
 Tamilselvi as Chandra: Meena`s Mother.
 Sri Deva as  Manoj Kumar - Muthu's elder brother
 Yogesh as Ravi Kumar - Muthu's younger brother
 A Revathy as Meenakshi: Annamalai's mother, who Muthu adores 
 Diwakar as Sathya - Meena's brother
 Sangeetha as Seetha - Meena's sister
 Atchaya Bharathi as Jeeva - Manoj’s love interest

Production

Casting 
Gomathi Priya was cast in the female lead role as Meena. Vetri Vasanth portrayed male lead role as Muthukumar. He is famous among youngster for his many short films. R. Sundarrajan was cast as supporting role, who is making her comeback after three years. Anila Sreekumar was cast as Vijaya. While Narasimha Raju, Yogesh and Tamilselvi were also selected for supporting roles.

Release 
The first promo was unveiled on 28 December 2022, featuring protagonist Gomathi Priya and Vetri Vasanth background story. The second promo was unveiled on 15 January 2023 and revealing the release date. The third promo was unveiled on 19 January 2023 featuring protagonist Vetri Vasanth family. The same day fourth promo was unveiled featuring protagonist Gomathi Priya family.

References

External links
 Siragadikka Aasai at Disney+ Hotstar

Star Vijay original programming
2023 Tamil-language television series debuts
Tamil-language television shows
Tamil-language romance television series
Tamil-language melodrama television series
Television shows set in Tamil Nadu